Angelo Stiller (born 4 April 2001) is a German professional footballer who plays for Bundesliga club 1899 Hoffenheim.

Career

Bayern Munich 
Stiller made his professional debut for Bayern's reserve team making 17 appearances during the 2019–20 season. In October 2020, Stiller made his debut for Bayern Munich in a 3–0 win over 1. FC Düren in the 2020–21 DFB-Pokal, as he came on as a substitute to Niklas Süle in the second half. On 1 December 2020, he made his Champions League debut in a 1–1 away draw against Atlético Madrid.

1899 Hoffenheim 
On 18 January 2021, it was announced that he would join 1899 Hoffenheim for the 2021–22 season.

Career statistics

Honours

Club
Bayern Munich II
 3. Liga: 2019–20

References

Living people
2001 births
Association football midfielders
German footballers
FC Bayern Munich footballers
FC Bayern Munich II players
TSG 1899 Hoffenheim players
Bundesliga players
3. Liga players
Germany under-21 international footballers
Footballers from Munich